Ladakh is a newly formed union territory  of India. This northernmost part of India had some of the highest mountain peaks in the world. Many of them are unclimbed and some of them unnamed. A large number of peaks in Ladakh are still not open for climbing due to security reasons, as this region borders Tibet Autonomous Region of the People's Republic of China in the North and East and Line of Control (LoC) and The India–Pakistan AGPL Actual Ground Position Line. That divides current positions of Indian and Pakistani military posts and troops in the West. There are five major mountain range in Ladakh From South The Great Himalaya range, Zanskar range, Ladakh range, Pangong range and Karakoram range.

Highest major summits
Following is a list of highest peaks of Ladakh

List of mountain peaks of ladakh

References 

Mountains of Ladakh
Mountains of India